Established in 1964, the Aga Khan Hospital, Dar es Salaam is a 170-bed multispecialty hospital. The hospital provides general medical services, specialist clinics and diagnostic services. It serves as a hub for several clinics around the city. It is also part of the Aga Khan Health Services international referral system, with links to the Aga Khan Hospital, Nairobi and the Aga Khan University Hospital, Karachi.

Facilities 
The hospital's services include a 15-bed intensive care unit for adult, cardiac and paediatric populations, a haemodialysis unit, an interventional cardiology unit, six operating theatres, a neurophysiology unit, general wards for all major subspecialities, a radiology service that includes MRI, CT and 3D mammography and a 24/7 emergency department.

The hospital launched its Cancer Care Centre in January 2020, which will serve as a key hub for the Tanzania Comprehensive Cancer Project. It is expected to be completed in 2024.

Education
The hospital, under the umbrella of the Aga Khan University offers residency programmes in Family Medicine, Internal Medicine and Surgery.

Accreditation
In 2016, AKH received Joint Commission International (JCI) accreditation, making it the only JCI accredited hospital in the country.

See also
Aga Khan Development Network
Muhimbili National Hospital in Dar es Salaam

References

Dar es Salaam
Hospital buildings completed in 1964
Aga Khan Dar es Salaam
Hospitals established in 1964
Buildings and structures in Dar es Salaam